This article lists the complete short story bibliography of Guy de Maupassant.

Notes

References 

Maupassant, Guy De